The team jumping in equestrian at the 1936 Olympic Games in Berlin was held at the Olympiastadion (jumping) on 16 August. The competition was also referred to as the "Prix des Nations."

Competition format
The team and individual jumping competitions used the same scores.

The jumping test featured 20 obstacles and had a time limit of 160 seconds. Points were lost for faults (including elimination for the third refusal on the course) and for exceeding the time limit. The schedule of faults was:
 3 points: first disobedience
 4 points: upsetting obstacle, touching water
 6 points: second disobedience, fall of horse
 10 points: fall of rider
 1/4 point: every second above 160

A team had to have all three pairs finish to be placed.

Results

References

Equestrian at the Summer Olympics